National Highway 461B, commonly referred to as NH 461B is a national highway in India. It is a secondary route of primary National Highway 61.  NH-461B runs in the state of Maharashtra in India.

Route 
NH461B connects Hingoli, Namdeo, Narsi, Sengaon, Sakhara, Risod and Malegaon in the state of Maharashtra.

Junctions  
 
  Terminal near Hingoli.
  Terminal near Malegaon.

See also 
 List of National Highways in India
 List of National Highways in India by state

References

External links 

 NH 461B on OpenStreetMap

National highways in India
National Highways in Maharashtra